Grodås is a village in Volda Municipality in Møre og Romsdal county, Norway. The village sits at the eastern end of the Kviven Tunnel, part of the new route for the European route E39 highway.

The village area is a tourist destination, with the natural environment, mountains and lake acting as a tourist attraction. It is also home to the Anders Svor Museum. Hornindal Church is located in the village. The industries located in the Grodås area include wood and furniture making as well as vacation home construction.

The village was the administrative centre of Hornindal Municipality until 2020.

References

Villages in Møre og Romsdal
Volda